Johannes Brüns (August 30, 1903 – May 7, 1965) was a German politician of the Christian Democratic Union (CDU) and former member of the German Bundestag.

Life 
He joined the CDU in 1946 and was a member of the city council of Essen and chairman of the social committee between 1948 and 1959. From 26 October 1959 to 28 November 1960 he was a member of the 3rd Bundestag as successor to the late Johann Kunze.

Literature

References

1903 births
1965 deaths
Members of the Bundestag for North Rhine-Westphalia
Members of the Bundestag 1957–1961
Members of the Bundestag for the Christian Democratic Union of Germany

Works councillors